Statistics of Kyrgyzstan League for the 2002 season.

The 2002 Kyrgyzstan League was contested by 10 teams with SKA PVO Bishkek winning the championship.

League Standings

Top scorers

References
Kyrgyzstan - List of final tables (RSSSF)

Kyrgyzstan League seasons
1
Kyrgyzstan
Kyrgyzstan